France competed at the 2019 World Athletics Championships in Doha, Qatar from 27 September to 6 October 2019. The country finished in 24th place in the medal table.

Medalists

Results
(q – qualified, NM – no mark, SB – season best)

Men

Track and road events

Field events

Combined events – Decathlon

Women
Track and road events

Field events

Combined events – Heptathlon

Mixed
Track and road events

References

External links
Doha｜WCH 19｜World Athletics

France
World Championships in Athletics
France at the World Championships in Athletics